Tacurong, officially the City of Tacurong (Maguindanaon: Kuta nu Takurung, Jawi: كوتا نو تاكوروڠ), is a 4th class component city in the province of Sultan Kudarat, Philippines. According to the 2020 census, it has a population of 109,319 people.

Tacurong has a total land area of 15,340 hectares, the smallest in land area among the province's 12 municipalities. Tacurong became a component city of Sultan Kudarat in 2000 by virtue of Republic Act No. 8805 in September 2000.

History
Tacurong was originally a barangay of the Municipality of Buluan. On August 3, 1951, it was created into a municipality by Executive Order Number 462 signed by the President Elpidio Quirino. At that time Tacurong had an estimated area of 40,000 hectares and 14 barangays. In 1961, the southern portion of Tacurong was separated to form the municipality of Tantangan, and in 1973, Tacurong lost some of its eastern portions when the municipality of President Quirino was created.

Cityhood

Following the efforts of Angelo O. Montilla, the Congressman of the Legislative District of Sultan Kudarat, Tacurong was made the first component city in the Province of Sultan Kudarat in 2000 by virtue of House Bill No. 6497 and Republic Act 8805. This was confirmed by the “Tacurongnons” in a plebiscite held on September 18, 2000.

Security incidents

Tacurong City has the most number of bombing incidents in Southern Philippines since 2000, as the city reportedly has the presence of different extortion and terrorist groups like Abu Sayyaf, BIFF and NPA.

New Year's Eve bombing December 31, 2017, 11:05 PM, 2 casualties and 17 hurt during the Improvised Explosive Device blast in Villa Garde KTV Bar National Highway, Barangay Buenaflor.

April 3, 2017 bombing Eight persons, mostly workers of an electric cooperative, were injured after an improvised bomb went off along the national highway in Tacurong City on Monday morning (Apr. 3), Bangsamoro Islamic Freedom Fighters (BIFF) is the suspected group who is responsible on the terrorist attack.

Twin bombing Seven people were hurt after two explosions rocked Tacurong City on April 17, 2017, the first explosion took place at 6:40 p.m. on the rooftop of Dragon Gas Station along National Highway in Barangay Isabela. Minutes later, or at 7:10 p.m., another explosion occurred, this time at the gas station's compound.

February 2, 2016 bombing Improvise explosive device (IED) rocked Tacurong City two hours after the convoy of vice presidential candidate Leni Robredo left the city on Tuesday afternoon. The bomb exploded around 2 p.m. near the national highway along Jose Abad Santos Street in Tacurong City. Three people were reportedly wounded.

Yellow bus bombing attempt The powerful bomb fashioned from two 60 mm mortars as main charge and mobile phone as trigger mechanism was found at 10:50 a.m. April 2015 inside Yellow Bus Line unit with body number 9208 at a police checkpoint in Barangay Dos along the Tacurong-Isulan highway.
The bus was heading toward Isulan from Tacurong City when subjected to inspection by police after Army and policemen received a report about the suspected bomb inside the bus.

November 6, 2022 bombing A homemade bomb went off in a bus as it was approaching a transport terminal in Tacurong City. The explosion killed a passenger and wounded 10 others.

Geography
Tacurong is in South Central Mindanao and the only city in the province of Sultan Kudarat. It is situated at the crossroads of Davao-GenSan-Cotabato highways.

Barangays
Tacurong is politically subdivided into 20 barangays.

Climate

Demographics

Economy

Tacurong City is the commercial hub of the province of Sultan Kudarat, catering the needs of nearby municipalities and the province of Maguindanao.

Infrastructure

Transportation
The city has an integrated terminal which vans and buses currently assigned on designated place. Tacurong to the far side places in their curriculums and places.

Bus companies operating in Tacurong City:
Yellow Bus Line, Inc. (General Santos/Koronadal City)
Mindanao Star (General Santos)
Rural Transit Mindanao, Inc. (General Santos/Cagayan de Oro)
Husky Tours (Cotabato City)

Health care facilities

Tacurong serves as the premier Health Care Center in the province of Sultan Kudarat and nearby provinces.

St. Louis Hospital is a modern tertiary hospital in the city, equipped with modern facilities such as 16-Slices CT Scan and the first and only Gamma Camera in Region 12.

Other notable facilities include:
Tomboc - Salayog Hospital
Quijano Clinic and Hospital
Sandig Medical Clinic and Hospital
Sultan Kudarat Doctors Hospital
Medical Mission Group Hospital and Health Services Cooperative
Lu Clinic and Hospital

Education
Tacurong City is also a center of education in Sultan Kudarat. Learners and Student from neighboring towns and municipalities, even from outside the Sultan Kudarat like Tantangan in South Cotabato and the municipalities in Maguindanao will go in the city to attend school.

Private schools
Table below is the list of private schools in the Tacurong City offering different curriculum levels.

Public schools

Table below is the list of public schools and university in the Tacurong City

Sister cities
 Iloilo City
Cotabato City

References

External links

 
 Tacurong Profile at the DTI Cities and Municipalities Competitive Index
 [ Philippine Standard Geographic Code]
 Philippine Census Information
 Local Governance Performance Management System

Populated places in Sultan Kudarat
Cities in Soccsksargen
Populated places established in 1951
1951 establishments in the Philippines
Component cities in the Philippines
Establishments by Philippine executive order